The following is a list of programs broadcast by Intercontinental Broadcasting Corporation (IBC), a Philippine free-to-air television network based in IBC Compound, Lot 3-B, Capitol Hills Drive, Diliman, Quezon City. IBC includes entertainment, news and public programs, informative and religious programs. As of late 2022, most of the programs are government media-produced, including some from PTV, Office of the Press Secretary, and Radyo Pilipinas, while fewer are independently produced.

For the previously aired defunct programs of IBC, see List of programs previously broadcast by Intercontinental Broadcasting Corporation.

Current original programming
Note: Titles are listed in alphabetical order followed by the year of debut in parentheses.

News 
IBC Express Balita (1998–2011, 2022)
IBC Special Report (2022; presidential coverage hook-up with PTV and Radyo Pilipinas)
Malacanang Press Briefing (2022; simulcast on PTV and Radyo Pilipinas)
PTV Sports 
Rise and Shine Pilipinas 
Sentro Balita 
Tutok 13 (2019; simulcast on Radyo Budyong Panay)

Public affairs 
 Bitag Live (produced by Bitag Multimedia Network, 2023; simulcast on CLTV 36)
 Gabay at Aksyon (2008–2011, 2017)
 #ipaBITAGmo (produced by Bitag Multimedia Network, 2023; simulcast on CLTV 36)
 Mike Abe Live (2022; simulcast on PTV and Radyo Pilipinas)

Drama 
Genius Teens (produced by Utmost Creatives, March 25, 2023)

Lifestyle 
Chinatown TV  (produced by Horizon of the Sun Communications, 2010-2020; 2021)

Infomercial 
 EZ Shop  (2004–2020, 2022, 2023) 
 TV Shop Philippines  (2015–2020, 2023)

Kid-oriented
 NCCT Originals (produced by National Council for Children's Television, 2023)

Religious 
Feast TV (2011)

Current acquired programming
Note: Titles are listed in alphabetical order, followed by the year of debut in parentheses.

ASEAN
ASEAN Documentaries 
 ASEAN: Changing Lives
 ASEAN Women Entrepreneurship
 Faces of ASEAN
 Proudly ASEAN
 Sharing ASEAN

See also
Intercontinental Broadcasting Corporation

References

Intercontinental Broadcasting Corporation
Intercontinental Broadcasting Corporation